Steak and oyster pie, also known as beef and oyster pie is a traditional Victorian English dish. It is also common in Australia and New Zealand. In Ireland, it has been prepared by the Ballymaloe House, and as a classic dish of the Ballymaloe Cookery School. In the United States, it's a regional dish of Norfolk, Virginia. There, neck, flank, round, or rump may be used. It is prepared in a Dutch oven, where it is slow-cooked until gelatinous. In New Zealand, steak and oyster pie may be made with Bluff oysters. It may also be made with ale. The dish is prepared by Rick Stein using Guinness beer.

See also
 List of pies, tarts and flans
 List of regional dishes of the United States

References

External links
 Recipe from a 1909 New Zealand publication

British pies
Australian pies
Irish cuisine
New Zealand pies
Oyster dishes
Beef steak dishes
Victorian cuisine